The 1949 English cricket season saw the 1949 County Championship being shared for the first time since the official competition began in 1890. New Zealand toured England to compete in a test series where all four matches were drawn.

Honours
County Championship - Middlesex, Yorkshire (shared title)
Minor Counties Championship - Lancashire II
Wisden - Trevor Bailey, Roly Jenkins, John Langridge, Reg Simpson, Bert Sutcliffe

County Championship

Test series

New Zealand tour

England and New Zealand drew all four Test matches.

Leading batsmen

Leading bowlers

References

Annual reviews
 Playfair Cricket Annual 1950
 Wisden Cricketers' Almanack 1950

External links
 CricketArchive – season summary

1949 in English cricket
English cricket seasons in the 20th century